The 2023 St. Louis Cardinals season will be the 142nd for the St. Louis Cardinals, a Major League Baseball (MLB) franchise in St. Louis, Missouri. It is the 132nd season for the Cardinals in the National League (NL) and their 18th at Busch Stadium III.

Previous season 
The Cardinals finished the 2022 season 93–69, to win the National League Central division title for the first time since 2019. They lost in the Wild Card round to the Philadelphia Phillies. The season also marked the final season for Cardinal legends Albert Pujols and Yadier Molina as both had announced their retirements prior to the season beginning.

Offseason

Rule changes 
Pursuant to the CBA, new rule changes will be in place for the 2023 season:

 institution of a pitch clock between pitches;
 limits on pickoff attempts per plate appearance;
 limits on defensive shifts requiring two infielders to be on either side of second and be within the boundary of the infield; and
 larger bases (increased to 18-inch squares);

Regular season

Game Log

 
|- style="background: 
| 1 || March 30 || Blue Jays || – || || || — || || – ||
|- style="background: 
| 2 || April 1 || Blue Jays || – || || || — || || – ||
|- style="background: 
| 3 || April 2 || Blue Jays || – || || || — || || – ||
|- style="background: 
| 4 || April 3 || Braves || – || || || — || || – ||
|- style="background: 
| 5 || April 4 || Braves || – || || || — || || – ||
|- style="background: 
| 6 || April 5 || Braves || – || || || — || || – ||
|- style="background: 
| 7 || April 7 || @ Brewers || – || || || — || || – ||
|- style="background: 
| 8 || April 8 || @ Brewers || – || || || — || || – ||
|- style="background: 
| 9 || April 9 || @ Brewers || – || || || — || || – ||
|- style="background: 
| 10 || April 10 || @ Rockies || – || || || — || || – ||
|- style="background: 
| 11 || April 11 || @ Rockies || – || || || — || || – ||
|- style="background: 
| 12 || April 12 || @ Rockies || – || || || — || || – ||
|- style="background: 
| 13 || April 13 || Pirates || – || || || — || || – ||
|- style="background: 
| 14 || April 14 || Pirates || – || || || — || || – ||
|- style="background: 
| 15 || April 15 || Pirates || – || || || — || || – ||
|- style="background: 
| 16 || April 16 || Pirates || – || || || — || || – ||
|- style="background: 
| 17 || April 17 || Diamondbacks || – || || || — || || – ||
|- style="background: 
| 18 || April 18 || Diamondbacks || – || || || — || || – ||
|- style="background: 
| 19 || April 19 || Diamondbacks || – || || || — || || – ||
|- style="background: 
| 20 || April 21 || @ Mariners || – || || || — || || – ||
|- style="background: 
| 21 || April 22 || @ Mariners || – || || || — || || – ||
|- style="background: 
| 22 || April 23 || @ Mariners || – || || || — || || – ||
|- style="background: 
| 23 || April 24 || @ Giants || – || || || — || || – ||
|- style="background: 
| 24 || April 25 || @ Giants || – || || || — || || – ||
|- style="background: 
| 25 || April 26 || @ Giants || – || || || — || || – ||
|- style="background: 
| 26 || April 27 || @ Giants || – || || || — || || – ||
|- style="background: 
| 27 || April 28 || @ Dodgers || – || || || — || || – ||
|- style="background: 
| 28 || April 29 || @ Dodgers || – || || || — || || – ||
|- style="background: 
| 29 || April 30 || @ Dodgers || – || || || — || || – ||
|- 
 
 
|- style="background: 
| 30 || May 2 || Angels || – || || || — || || – ||
|- style="background: 
| 31 || May 3 || Angels || – || || || — || || – ||
|- style="background: 
| 32 || May 4 || Angels || – || || || — || || – ||
|- style="background: 
| 33 || May 5 || Tigers || – || || || — || || – ||
|- style="background: 
| 34 || May 6 || Tigers || – || || || — || || – ||
|- style="background: 
| 35 || May 7 || Tigers || – || || || — || || – ||
|- style="background: 
| 36 || May 8 || @ Cubs || – || || || — || || – ||
|- style="background: 
| 37 || May 9 || @ Cubs || – || || || — || || – ||
|- style="background: 
| 38 || May 10 || @ Cubs || – || || || — || || – ||
|- style="background: 
| 39 || May 12 || @ Red Sox || – || || || — || || – ||
|- style="background: 
| 40 || May 13 || @ Red Sox || – || || || — || || – ||
|- style="background: 
| 41 || May 14 || @ Red Sox || – || || || — || || – ||
|- style="background: 
| 42 || May 15 || Brewers || – || || || — || || – ||
|- style="background: 
| 43 || May 16 || Brewers || – || || || — || || – ||
|- style="background: 
| 44 || May 17 || Brewers || – || || || — || || – ||
|- style="background: 
| 45 || May 18 || Dodgers || – || || || — || || – ||
|- style="background: 
| 46 || May 19 || Dodgers || – || || || — || || – ||
|- style="background: 
| 47 || May 20 || Dodgers || – || || || — || || – ||
|- style="background: 
| 48 || May 21 || Dodgers || – || || || — || || – ||
|- style="background: 
| 49 || May 22 || @ Reds || – || || || — || || – ||
|- style="background: 
| 50 || May 23 || @ Reds || – || || || — || || – ||
|- style="background: 
| 51 || May 24 || @ Reds || – || || || — || || – ||
|- style="background: 
| 52 || May 25 || @ Reds || – || || || — || || – ||
|- style="background: 
| 53 || May 26 || @ Guardians || – || || || — || || – ||
|- style="background: 
| 54 || May 27 || @ Guardians || – || || || — || || – ||
|- style="background: 
| 55 || May 28 || @ Guardians || – || || || — || || – ||
|- style="background: 
| 56 || May 29 || Royals || – || || || — || || – ||
|- style="background: 
| 57 || May 30 || Royals || – || || || — || || – ||
|- 
 

|- style="background: 
| 58 || June 2 || @ Pirates || – || || || — || || – ||
|- style="background: 
| 59 || June 3 || @ Pirates || – || || || — || || – ||
|- style="background: 
| 60 || June 4 || @ Pirates || – || || || — || || – ||
|- style="background: 
| 61 || June 5 || @ Rangers || – || || || — || || – ||
|- style="background: 
| 62 || June 6 || @ Rangers || – || || || — || || – ||
|- style="background: 
| 63 || June 7 || @ Rangers || – || || || — || || – ||
|- style="background: 
| 64 || June 9 || Reds || – || || || — || || – ||
|- style="background: 
| 65 || June 10 || Reds || – || || || — || || – ||
|- style="background: 
| 66 || June 11 || Reds || – || || || — || || – ||
|- style="background: 
| 67 || June 12 || Giants || – || || || — || || – ||
|- style="background: 
| 68 || June 13 || Giants || – || || || — || || – ||
|- style="background: 
| 69 || June 14 || Giants || – || || || — || || – ||
|- style="background: 
| 70 || June 16 || @ Mets || – || || || — || || – ||
|- style="background: 
| 71 || June 17 || @ Mets || – || || || — || || – ||
|- style="background: 
| 72 || June 18 || @ Mets || – || || || — || || – ||
|- style="background: 
| 73 || June 19 || @ Nationals || – || || || — || || – ||
|- style="background: 
| 74 || June 20 || @ Nationals || – || || || — || || – ||
|- style="background: 
| 75 || June 21 || @ Nationals || – || || || — || || – ||
|- style="background: 
| 76 || June 24 || Cubs || – || || || — || || – ||
|- style="background: 
| 77 || June 25 || Cubs || – || || || — || || – ||
|- style="background: 
| 78 || June 27 || Astros || – || || || — || || – ||
|- style="background: 
| 79 || June 28 || Astros || – || || || — || || – ||
|- style="background: 
| 80 || June 29 || Astros || – || || || — || || – ||
|- style="background: 
| 81 || June 30 || Yankees || – || || || — || || – ||
|-
|colspan=11|
|- 
 

|- style="background: 
| 82 || July 1 || Yankees || – || || || — || || – ||
|- style="background: 
| 83 || July 2 || Yankees || – || || || — || || – ||
|- style="background: 
| 84 || July 3 || @ Marlins || – || || || — || || – ||
|- style="background: 
| 85 || July 4 || @ Marlins || – || || || — || || – ||
|- style="background: 
| 86 || July 5 || @ Marlins || – || || || — || || – ||
|- style="background: 
| 87 || July 6 || @ Marlins || – || || || — || || – ||
|- style="background: 
| 88 || July 7 || @ White Sox || – || || || — || || – ||
|- style="background: 
| 89 || July 8 || @ White Sox || – || || || — || || – ||
|- style="background: 
| 90 || July 9 || @ White Sox || – || || || — || || – ||
|- style=background:#bbbfff 
|colspan=11|93rd All-Star Game in Seattle, Washington
|- style="background: 
| 91 || July 14 || Nationals || – || || || — || || – ||
|- style="background: 
| 92 || July 15 || Nationals || – || || || — || || – ||
|- style="background: 
| 93 || July 16 || Nationals || – || || || — || || – ||
|- style="background: 
| 94 || July 17 || Marlins || – || || || — || || – ||
|- style="background: 
| 95 || July 18 || Marlins || – || || || — || || – ||
|- style="background: 
| 96 || July 19 || Marlins || – || || || — || || – ||
|- style="background: 
| 97 || July 20 || @ Cubs || – || || || — || || – ||
|- style="background: 
| 98 || July 21 || @ Cubs || – || || || — || || – ||
|- style="background: 
| 99 || July 22 || @ Cubs || – || || || — || || – ||
|- style="background: 
| 100 || July 23 || @ Cubs || – || || || — || || – ||
|- style="background: 
| 101 || July 24 || @ Diamondbacks || – || || || — || || – ||
|- style="background: 
| 102 || July 25 || @ Diamondbacks || – || || || — || || – ||
|- style="background: 
| 103 || July 26 || @ Diamondbacks || – || || || — || || – ||
|- style="background: 
| 104 || July 27 || Cubs || – || || || — || || – ||
|- style="background: 
| 105 || July 28 || Cubs || – || || || — || || – ||
|- style="background: 
| 106 || July 29 || Cubs || – || || || — || || – ||
|- style="background: 
| 107 || July 30 || Cubs || – || || || — || || – ||
|- 
 

|- style="background: 
| 108 || August 1 || Twins || – || || || — || || – ||
|- style="background: 
| 109 || August 2 || Twins || – || || || — || || – ||
|- style="background: 
| 110 || August 3 || Twins || – || || || — || || – ||
|- style="background: 
| 111 || August 4 || Rockies || – || || || — || || – ||
|- style="background: 
| 112 || August 5 || Rockies || – || || || — || || – ||
|- style="background: 
| 113 || August 6 || Rockies || – || || || — || || – ||
|- style="background: 
| 114 || August 8 || @ Rays || – || || || — || || – ||
|- style="background: 
| 115 || August 9 || @ Rays || – || || || — || || – ||
|- style="background: 
| 116 || August 10 || @ Rays || – || || || — || || – ||
|- style="background: 
| 117 || August 11 || @ Royals || – || || || — || || – ||
|- style="background: 
| 118 || August 12 || @ Royals || – || || || — || || – ||
|- style="background: 
| 119 || August 14 || Athletics || – || || || — || || – ||
|- style="background: 
| 120 || August 15 || Athletics || – || || || — || || – ||
|- style="background: 
| 121 || August 16 || Athletics || – || || || — || || – ||
|- style="background: 
| 122 || August 17 || Mets || – || || || — || || – ||
|- style="background: 
| 123 || August 18 || Mets || – || || || — || || – ||
|- style="background: 
| 124 || August 19 || Mets || – || || || — || || – ||
|- style="background: 
| 125 || August 20 || Mets || – || || || — || || – ||
|- style="background: 
| 126 || August 21 || @ Pirates || – || || || — || || – ||
|- style="background: 
| 127 || August 22 || @ Pirates || – || || || — || || – ||
|- style="background: 
| 128 || August 23 || @ Pirates || – || || || — || || – ||
|- style="background: 
| 129 || August 25 || @ Phillies || – || || || — || || – ||
|- style="background: 
| 130 || August 26 || @ Phillies || – || || || — || || – ||
|- style="background: 
| 131 || August 27 || @ Phillies || – || || || — || || – ||
|- style="background: 
| 132 || August 28 || Padres || – || || || — || || – ||
|- style="background: 
| 133 || August 29 || Padres || – || || || — || || – ||
|- style="background: 
| 134 || August 30 || Padres || – || || || — || || – ||
|- 
 

|- style="background: 
| 135 || September 1 || Pirates || – || || || — || || – ||
|- style="background: 
| 136 || September 2 || Pirates || – || || || — || || – ||
|- style="background: 
| 137 || September 3 || Pirates || – || || || — || || – ||
|- style="background: 
| 138 || September 5 || @ Braves || – || || || — || || – ||
|- style="background: 
| 139 || September 6 || @ Braves || – || || || — || || – ||
|- style="background: 
| 140 || September 7 || @ Braves || – || || || — || || – ||
|- style="background: 
| 141 || September 8 || @ Reds || – || || || — || || – ||
|- style="background: 
| 142 || September 9 || @ Reds || – || || || — || || – ||
|- style="background: 
| 143 || September 10 || @ Reds || – || || || — || || – ||
|- style="background: 
| 144 || September 11 || @ Orioles || – || || || — || || – ||
|- style="background: 
| 145 || September 12 || @ Orioles || – || || || — || || – ||
|- style="background: 
| 146 || September 13 || @ Orioles || – || || || — || || – ||
|- style="background: 
| 147 || September 15 || Phillies || – || || || — || || – ||
|- style="background: 
| 148 || September 16 || Phillies || – || || || — || || – ||
|- style="background: 
| 149 || September 17 || Phillies || – || || || — || || – ||
|- style="background: 
| 150 || September 18 || Brewers || – || || || — || || – ||
|- style="background: 
| 151 || September 19 || Brewers || – || || || — || || – ||
|- style="background: 
| 152 || September 20 || Brewers || – || || || — || || – ||
|- style="background: 
| 153 || September 21 || Brewers || – || || || — || || – ||
|- style="background: 
| 154 || September 22 || @ Padres || – || || || — || || – ||
|- style="background: 
| 155 || September 23 || @ Padres || – || || || — || || – ||
|- style="background: 
| 156 || September 24 || @ Padres || – || || || — || || – ||
|- style="background: 
| 157 || September 26 || @ Brewers || – || || || — || || – ||
|- style="background: 
| 158 || September 27 || @ Brewers || – || || || — || || – ||
|- style="background: 
| 159 || September 28 || @ Brewers || – || || || — || || – ||
|- style="background: 
| 160 || September 29 || Reds || – || || || — || || – ||
|- style="background: 
| 161 || September 30 || Reds || – || || || — || || – ||
|- style="background: 
| 162 || October 1 || Reds || – || || || — || || – ||
|-

Season standings

National League Central

National League Wild Card

Roster

Minor league system and first-year player draft

Teams

References

External links
St. Louis Cardinals 2023 schedule at MLB.com
2023 St. Louis Cardinals schedule at ESPN
2023 St. Louis Cardinals season at Baseball Reference

St. Louis Cardinals seasons
St. Louis Cardinals
St. Louis Cardinals